Studebaker was an American wagon and automobile manufacturer.

Studebaker may also refer to:

 Studebaker Building (disambiguation)
 List of Studebaker vehicles
 Studebaker-Packard Corporation
 Studebaker Canada

People with the name
 Studebaker auto manufacturer family
 Clement Studebaker (1831–1901), American automobile pioneer
 Clement Studebaker Jr. (1871–1932), American automobile manufacturer
 John Studebaker (1833–1917), American automobile pioneer
 Peter Studebaker (1836–1897), American automobile manufacturer
 Andy Studebaker (born 1985), American football linebacker
 Hugh Studebaker (1900–1978), American actor
 John Ward Studebaker (1887–1989), American education commissioner
 Ted Studebaker (1945–1971), American activist 
 Toby Studebaker, US marine jailed for child grooming over the internet
 Studebaker John  (born 1952), American blues musician

See also
 Sara Studebaker-Hall (born 1984), American biathlete
 Lexington Studebakers, a minor league baseball team based in Lexington, Kentucky